The knockout stage of the women's football tournament at the 2016 Summer Olympics was played from 12 to 19 August 2016. The top two teams from each group in the group stage and the two best third-placed teams qualified for the knockout stage.

All times are local, BRT (UTC−3).

Qualified teams

Bracket
In the knockout stages, if a match is level at the end of normal playing time, extra time is played (two periods of 15 minutes each) and followed, if necessary, by a penalty shoot-out to determine the winner.

On 18 March 2016, the FIFA Executive Committee agreed that the competition would be part of the International Football Association Board's trial to allow a fourth substitute to be made during extra time.

Quarter-finals

United States vs Sweden

China PR vs Germany

Canada vs France

Brazil vs Australia

Semi-finals

Brazil vs Sweden

Canada vs Germany

Bronze medal match

Gold medal match

References

External links
Football – Women, Rio2016.com
Women's Olympic Football Tournament, Rio 2016, FIFA.com

knockout stage